The 1989 Swatch Open, also known as the Nice Open, was a men's tennis tournament played on outdoor clay courts at the Nice Lawn Tennis Club in Nice, France, and was part of the 1989 Nabisco Grand Prix. It was the 18th edition of the tournament and took place from 17 April through 23 April 1989. Sixth-seeded Andrei Chesnokov won the singles title.

Finals

Singles

 Andrei Chesnokov defeated  Jérôme Potier 6–4, 6–4
 It was Chesnokov's 1st title of the year and the 3rd of his career.

Doubles

 Ricki Osterthun /  Udo Riglewski defeated  Heinz Günthardt /  Balázs Taróczy 7–6, 6–7, 6–1
 It was Osterthun's only title of the year and the 4th of his career. It was Riglewski's 2nd title of the year and the 4th of his career.

References

External links
 ITF tournament edition details